Master FVB (active c. 1480 — 1500) was an anonymous early Netherlandish engraver. According to one tradition, the artist is identical to Franz von Bocholt, but there seems to be no evidence to support such a claim.

Arthur M. Hind remarks on the influence of Dieric Bouts on the work of Master FVB. Hind also notes about Master FVB that "in spirit he comes nearer than any engraver of the time to the Master of the Amsterdam Cabinet and Schongauer."

Further reading 
 Hans M. Schmidt, et al. "Masters, anonymous, and monogrammists." In Grove Art Online. Oxford Art Online,  (accessed February 1, 2012; subscription required).

References

External links 
 
 Entry for Master FVB on the Union List of Artist Names
 Master FVB on ArtCyclopedia
 Master FVB's "The Annuciation", with analysis, at the British Museum

FVB
15th-century engravers